Belgium competed at the 1992 Summer Paralympics in Barcelona, Spain. 73 competitors from Belgium won 17 medals including 5 gold, 5 silver and 7 bronze and finished 21st in the medal table.

See also 
 Belgium at the Paralympics
 Belgium at the 1992 Summer Olympics

References 

1992
1992 in Belgian sport
Nations at the 1992 Summer Paralympics